Stephen Tully is a former member of the Arizona House of Representatives from January 2001 until January 2007. He was first elected to the House in November 2000, representing District 24. After redistricting in 2002, Tully was reelected in both 2002, now representing District 11, and was re-elected in 2004, Tully did not run for re-election in 2006.

References

Republican Party members of the Arizona House of Representatives
Living people
Year of birth missing (living people)